George Crawley may refer to:
 George A. Crawley, British artist and designer
 George Baden Crawley, railway contractor